Collemopsidiales is an order of fungi in the class Dothideomycetes. First circumscribed by Sergio Pérez-Ortega, Isaac Garrido-Benavent and Martin Grube in 2016, it contains a single family, Xanthopyreniaceae.

Citations

References 

 
 
 

Dothideomycetes
Ascomycota orders
Lichen orders